"A Place in the World" is the second episode of the fifth and final series of the period drama Upstairs, Downstairs. It first aired on 14 September 1975 on ITV.

Background
A Place in the World was recorded in the studio on 23 and 24 January 1975, with the location footage having been filmed in Rotherhithe, London on 20 January.

Cast
Gordon Jackson - Hudson
Angela Baddeley - Mrs Bridges
David Langton - Richard Bellamy
Raymond Huntley - Sir Geoffrey Dillon
Hannah Gordon - Virginia Bellamy
Simon Williams - James Bellamy
Christopher Beeny - Edward
Karen Dotrice - Lily
Gareth Hunt - Frederick
Jenny Tomasin - Ruby
Jacqueline Tong - Daisy
Michael Logan - Arthur Knowles
Ann Mitchell - Militant Woman
Jay Neill - First Heckler
Jack Le White - Second Heckler
Derek Martin - Third Heckler
Una Brandon-Jones - Mother
Brian Nolan - Fourth Heckler

Plot
It is February 1920, and James writes a letter to The Times about the unemployment of former soldiers. Sir Geoffrey then tells James that Conservative Central Office were impressed and, after a bit of persuading, James agrees to stand in a forthcoming by-election for Parliament. The seat is Rotherhithe East, a safe Labour seat in the London Docklands. After initially ignoring his father's help, Virginia persuades James to allow Richard to help him in the campaign. Richard and Virginia attend a talk James is giving the day before the election, but James is verbal attacked by some members of the audience and the hall then descends into chaos. In the election, the Labour candidate gets 18,928 votes, James gets 7,369 votes while the Socialist Labour candidate gets 1043 votes. While Conservative Central Office is pleased with James' performance, James is disappointed and says he will not stand for Parliament again. However, he is pleased when Hudson tells him he reduced the Labour majority by 639 votes.

Meanwhile, Edward and Daisy visit downstairs and they are visibly experiencing financial hardship and Daisy has had a miscarriage. They leave in embarrassment after Edward argues with Mr Hudson when their poverty becomes clear. Soon after, Frederick delivers a pair of shoes to Daisy from Mrs Bridges, and Edward is enraged when she accepts them. In the meantime, Hudson has suggested to Virginia that she employ the couple. Edward and Daisy both leap at the chance when Virginia offers them the job and the flat that goes above the garage. Edward becomes chauffeur and valet to James on a wage of £40 year, while Daisy replaces Rose as Head House Parlourmaid on a wage of £35 a year. Rose, who is in Southwold following the death of her aunt, is to become Lady Bellamy's lady's maid.

Reception
James Murray reviewed A Place in the World for The Daily Express. He praised writer Jeremy Paul for injecting a "remarkable degree of insight". Murray said that "the confrontation made electrifying television" and the episode "rich and faultless". It ended his review by commenting that he could not see how LWT would be able "to snuff out the lives of the marvellous characters of Eaton Place" at the end of this series.

References

Richard Marson, "Inside UpDown - The Story of Upstairs, Downstairs", Kaleidoscope Publishing, 2005
Updown.org.uk - Upstairs, Downstairs Fansite

Upstairs, Downstairs (series 5) episodes
1975 British television episodes
Fiction set in 1920